Armand Lebrun de la Houssaye (20 October 1768–19 June 1848) led a cavalry division during the First French Empire of Napoleon. He joined the army of the First French Republic in 1791 and fought at Kaiserslautern in 1793. He was appointed to lead a hussar regiment the following year. Promoted to general officer in 1804, he led a heavy cavalry brigade at Austerlitz, Eylau, and Heilsberg and a division at Friedland. Transferred to Spain, he commanded a dragoon division under Marshal Nicolas Soult at Corunna, Braga, First and Second Porto, and Arzobispo in 1809. In 1812 he led a cavalry division in the III Cavalry Corps during the French invasion of Russia where he was badly wounded at Borodino. While recovering in the hospital, he was captured by the Russians and held until the peace in 1814. Lahoussaye is one of the names inscribed under the Arc de Triomphe on Column 6.

Life in Utrecht
When he came to Utrecht (NL) to recover, he fell in love with his neighbor's daughter, Charlotte Juliana Vossenberg. They were married on May 11, 1797. They had one daughter, Carolina Julia (1798-1876) who was baptised Evangelical Lutheran.

References

 

 https://hetutrechtsarchief.nl/collectie/08977DAAF0037BDDE0534701000A4B62

French generals
French military personnel of the French Revolutionary Wars
French commanders of the Napoleonic Wars
Military personnel from Paris
1768 births
1848 deaths
Names inscribed under the Arc de Triomphe